RJ Hadley (born Rakeim Jerhal Hadley on January 14, 1969) is an American activist and former Tax Commissioner of Rockdale County, Georgia. In 2008 he was a delegate to the Democratic National Convention representing Georgia.

Hadley is a graduate of Dartmouth College. He has worked in the public sector as juvenile justice social worker for the State of New Jersey. He has also held software technology positions in the United States and abroad with the Federal Aviation Administration, Motorola, and Logica. In 2009, he was appointed Chief of Staff for Rockdale County. He served as the Chief Operating Officer for Affordable Housing CDC, a non-profit housing and economic development organization, until his election as Tax Commissioner in 2012.

In 2010, Hadley sought the Democratic Party's nomination for Senate in Georgia, losing to Labor Commissioner Mike Thurmond. On January 29, 2011, he was elected Vice-Chair of County Parties with the Democratic Party of Georgia.

Personal life

He is married to noted bird veterinarian Dr. Tarah Hadley. They met at Dartmouth.

Political Activism

Hadley was an early volunteer for the Barack Obama presidential campaign when an Obama campaign office opened in Atlanta in 2007. He went on to volunteer for the Obama campaign throughout Georgia, South Carolina, North Carolina, and Texas. In 2008, he was chosen by the Obama campaign to serve as an At-Large delegate at the Democratic National Convention in Denver. He was also the campaign manager for Richard Oden who became Rockdale County’s first African-American Chairman in 2009.

2010 U.S. Senate campaign

In 2009, Hadley announced his campaign to seek the Democratic Party of Georgia’s nomination for United States Senate to replace Johnny Isakson, a Republican. For nearly a year he ran unopposed until Labor Commissioner Michael Thurmond entered the race in the last week of qualifying. In the primary election held on July 20, 2010, Hadley garnered 15.7% of the popular vote.

Rockdale County Tax Commissioner

In 2012, Hadley was elected Tax Commissioner in Rockdale County. He defeated Republican incumbent Dan Ray with 51.73% of the vote.

Further reading

 United States Senate election in Georgia, 2010

References

1969 births
Living people
Dartmouth College alumni
People from Conyers, Georgia
African-American people in Georgia (U.S. state) politics
County officials in Georgia (U.S. state)
21st-century African-American people
20th-century African-American people